Thoubal  is a town, a municipal council with 18 municipal wards and district Headquarters in Thoubal district in the Indian state of Manipur. The name 'Thoubal' comes from 'Athouba' meaning brave people symbolising the courageous people of the district. It is one of the larger towns of Manipur. It is idyllic and has many lakes and rivers, paddy fields, and gardens. It is also the window to South-East Asia as the Trans-Asian highway (AH1) passes through it. It is well connected with Imphal, Kakching, Moreh and Yairipok.

The main attractions include Chinga Lairembi temple, Tomjing ching, Panthoibi temple, Thoubal Bazar, Thangjing ching (from where one can have a bird's eye view of without lake), and Khangabok Menjor garden. The main shopping centers are Thoubal Keithel, Ningombam Luxmi Bazar (popular for Tharoi Kanghou), Athokpam Bazar, and Babu Bazar. Thoubal College and Waikhom Mani Girls College are the two government colleges in the town. Notable schools are Chaoyaima Higher Secondary School, K M Blooming Higher Secondary School, The Somorendra Sana Royal Higher Secondary School, Vision Creative School of Science, The Fancier Abhiram Higher School, The Chaoyaima Higher Secondary School, Evergreen Flower School, Step Foundation, Ananda Purna High School, Ruda Academy, Paradise English School, MS Global Academy, New Era Higher Secondary School, Peace and Freedom Academy (PAFA), Advance Kid Care and The Tangjeng Ningthou Flowers School. A new district hospital has come up and is providing health care services to the general population. Healthcare services are also being provided by Kshetri Sanglen, Rapha Hospital, etc. Thoubal also has the distinction of having the first and only subway in the whole of Manipur. Just beside the subway, one will find 'Bokajan' where you can get any brand of spirits. Many industrial, as well as commercial startups, have come up recently. Thoubal was also the venue for Singju festival 2017 which was held at Khangabok Menjor Garden. The 37th Junior National Kho Kho Championship under the aegis of the Kho Kho Federation of India was held at Basu Ground, Khangabok from 26–30 March 2018.

Geography
It has an average elevation of 765 metres (2509 feet). Main market/keithel is located at the bank of the Thoubal River and pass through by National Highway 2.

Demographics
 India census, Thoubal had a population of 41,149. Males constitute 50% of the population and females 50%. Thoubal has an average literacy rate of 75%, higher than the national average of 59.5%: male literacy is 85%, and female literacy is 65%. In Thoubal, 13% of the population is under 6 years of age.

Politics
Thoubal is part of 31 - Thoubal Assembly Constituency, Manipur (Immediate past Chief Minister of Manipur Shri O. Ibobi Singh is elected from Thoubal A/C), Thoubal District and Inner Manipur (Lok Sabha constituency).

Transport

Tata Magic, Auto, winger are the only means of transport to and from Thoubal. Other public transport systems like buses, trains and air transport have suffered and declined due to the excessive plying of 'magic'.

Road

AH-1 passes through the heart of Thoubal town and it connected with Imphal toward north and east by Moreh the border town of Manipur. It is also connected with Yairipok and Mayang-Imphal by inter district road. Regular private taxis ply between Imphal. Yairipok is only 5 km from the heart of Thoubal and through Yairipok Andro and Other Places of Imphal east district can be connected.

Economy
According to the Socio-Economic survey of 2006, the working population is 15,320, which accounts for 36.94% of the total population of the town. Of this, the working male population is 10,207 (24.61%) and that of females is 5,113 (12.33%). The per capita annual income of the working population is Rs. 24,810.

Thoubal Bazar is the main business hub of the surrounding villages. A variety of hand loom and handicraft products are produced. Agriculture is the main source of income for the majority of the population. The Central Rice Research Institute is located at Khangabok. The Khansari sugar factory was established in Khangabok, but it is non-functional at present and has been converted into an IRB battalion.

Fisheries
Thoubal has huge potential for fisheries and aquaculture in the Waithou lake and surrounding rivers and water bodies, however excessive encroachment and conversion of water bodies into paddy fields, agricultural lands and homesteads have greatly reduced the area of the lake. A tourist guest house was constructed in the middle of the Waithou lake to boost tourism, however it lies decrepit also non-functional. "G & R Aqua Technologies", a private fish seed production cum demonstration farm was established in the waithou PatThoubal since 2011 to provide quality fish seeds to the fish farmers and to promote sustainable aquaculture through demonstration.

Colleges
 Thoubal College, Thoubal
 Waikhom Mani girls college, Thoubal
 IGNOU study center Thoubal college

Sports
Thoubal district indoor stadium, Thoubal
Chaoyaima Lampak

References

 Government of Manipur Tourism website

 
Cities and towns in Thoubal district